James Louis Fregosi (April 4, 1942 – February 14, 2014) was an American professional baseball shortstop and manager, who played in Major League Baseball (MLB) from  to , primarily for the Los Angeles / California Angels. He also played for the New York Mets, Texas Rangers, and Pittsburgh Pirates.

Having been the Angels’ most productive and popular player for that franchise's first eleven years of play, Fregosi quickly became its first star. He led the American League (AL) in defensive double plays twice, winning the  Gold Glove Award, and, upon leaving the team, ranked ninth in AL history, with 818 double plays. Fregosi holds the franchise record with 70 career triples; several of his other team records, including career games (1,429), hits (1,408), doubles (219), runs (691), and runs batted in (546), were broken by Brian Downing over the course of the  through  seasons.

In February, 2014, Fregosi suffered a stroke while on an MLB alumni cruise. He was taken to a hospital in Florida for treatment, where he was put on life support. Subsequently, after having suffered multiple additional strokes in the hospital, Fregosi was removed from life support and died a few hours later. At the time of his death, he was the top advance scout for the Atlanta Braves.

Playing career
The same year he was selected by the Angels in the 1960 MLB Expansion Draft, and made his debut in September .

After hitting .291 as a reserve in 1962, he batted .287 – ninth in the AL – in his first full season in 1963, and was second in the league in triples and fifth in hits. He made his first All-Star squad in 1964, batting .277. From 1964 to mid-1969, he teamed with second baseman Bobby Knoop to form one of the game's top double play combinations; with Knoop winning Gold Gloves from 1966 to 1968, the two became only the third middle infield combination to win the honor in the same season (1967). On July 28, he became the first Angel to hit for the cycle (and the only man to do so at Dodger Stadium until Orlando Hudson accomplished the feat in 2009), and he did so again on May 20,  but this one was an unnatural cycle. Fregosi continued to turn out solid years, particularly in 1967 when he batted .290 (seventh in the AL) and won his only Gold Glove, finishing seventh in the MVP voting. He became regarded as the league's top-hitting shortstop, leading the AL in triples (13) in 1968, and was named an All-Star every season from 1966 to 1970. But he was sidelined in  when a tumor was discovered in his foot. The Angels became uncertain of Fregosi's future, and on December 10 traded him to the New York Mets in the same deal that brought pitcher Nolan Ryan to California. (Fregosi would later manage Ryan in 1978 and 1979, Ryan's last two years as an Angel.)

After five years as a backup for the Rangers (1973–77), during which he played primarily as a first baseman, he was sent to the Pittsburgh Pirates in June 1977.

In his 18-year career, Fregosi batted .265 with 1726 hits, 151 home runs, 844 runs, 706 RBI, 264 doubles, 78 triples, and 76 stolen bases in 1902 games played. Brian Downing broke his club marks for career at bats (5244), total bases (2112) and extra base hits (404).

Fregosi was the last player to retire who was a member of the "original" Los Angeles Angels.

Managerial career

California Angels

In becoming the Angels' manager at age 36, Fregosi was presented with a solid team nucleus of Ryan, Baylor, Downing, Bobby Grich, Carney Lansford, Frank Tanana and longtime owner Gene Autry, compiling a record of 62–55 in 117 games, and tying for second with Texas behind the Kansas City Royals. In 1979, with the addition of Rod Carew, he led the Angels to an 88–74 record, surprising the Royals and winning the first title in the club's 19-year existence. But they didn't have enough to get by the Baltimore Orioles in the 1979 American League Championship Series, losing Game 1 in 10 innings and dropping a 9–8 slugfest in Game 2; the Angels captured a 4–3 win in Game 3, scoring twice in the bottom of the ninth on an error and a Larry Harlow double, but were knocked out in an 8–0 Game 4 loss. Fregosi's record was 237 wins and 248 losses in the regular season and one win and three losses in the postseason.

Louisville Redbirds
From the Angels, Fregosi was brought back into the game by Cardinals Farm Director Lee Thomas to manage the Louisville Redbirds of the American Association for three seasons.  Louisville won the league championship in Fregosi's first season in 1983, and lost the league championship in the playoffs.  In Fregosi's second season, Louisville tied for fourth place in the regular season but won the 1984 league championship.  In 1985 Fregosi's Louisville team finished the season in first place and won the league championship in the playoffs also.

Chicago White Sox
Fregosi managed the team for three seasons, in each of which the White Sox finished in fifth place in the American League West. Fregosi was released at the end of the  season. Fregosi finished with a record of 193 wins and 226 losses in the regular season. He didn't manage any post-season games for the White Sox.

Philadelphia Phillies
Despite putting up a good fight against the defending World Champion Toronto Blue Jays in the World Series, Fregosi's Phillies wound up losing to Toronto in six games, with Joe Carter's Series-winning home run in Game 6 being the final blow.

Despite the World Series run, Fregosi was often the target of criticism by the Philadelphia sports media. One general criticism of Fregosi was that he was a manager who relied on veteran players and was unable to develop younger players. He was ultimately fired by the Phillies in  after posting a series of dismal post-1993 seasons. Fregosi finished with a record of 431 wins and 463 losses in the regular season and six wins and six losses in the postseason.

Toronto Blue Jays
Fregosi was hired away from the San Francisco Giants, where he had been serving as a special assistant, to become the new manager for the Blue Jays in  one month before the season began. He replaced Tim Johnson, who was fired after one year due to lying about his military service. The team finished in third place and above .500 in each of Fregosi's two seasons in Toronto. On July 27, 2000, he won his 1,000th game as manager, doing so against the Seattle Mariners 7-2. Despite fair results, he was let go after the season. Fregosi finished with a record of 167 wins and 157 losses in the regular season. This ended up being his final managerial position in Major League Baseball. This was the only team where he finished with an overall winning record.

Post-managerial career
As a manager, he had a record of 1028 wins and 1094 losses in 15 seasons. He also managed 16 post-season games. His post-season record was seven wins and nine losses. The job ended up going to Charlie Manuel.

Fregosi delivered a eulogy at the March 2007 funeral of longtime friend and former Phillies coach John Vukovich.

In February 2014, Fregosi was a part of an MLB Alumni cruise when he suffered multiple strokes. The cruise docked in the Cayman Islands where he was rushed to a local hospital, where his condition was stabilized by doctors before he was relocated to Miami. However, on February 13, Fregosi's condition declined and he died the following day. Phillies owner David Montgomery called Fregosi a "dear friend" after his death.

Managerial record

Personal life
Fregosi was the son of Archie and Margaret Fregosi and grew up in South San Francisco, California. His paternal grandparents were Italian while his maternal grandparents were English and Irish.

See also

List of Gold Glove middle infield duos
List of Major League Baseball annual triples leaders
List of Major League Baseball managers by wins
List of Major League Baseball players to hit for the cycle

References

 Baseball: The Biographical Encyclopedia (2000). Kingston, New York: Total/Sports Illustrated. .

Further reading

External links

Jim Fregosi at SABR (Baseball BioProject)
Jim Fregosi at Baseball Almanac
Jim Fregosi at Baseball Gauge
Jim Fregosi at Baseball Biography
Jim Fregosi at Ultimate Mets Database

1942 births
2014 deaths
People from South San Francisco, California
Alpine Cowboys players
American expatriate baseball people in Canada
American League All-Stars
Atlanta Braves scouts
Baseball coaches from California
California Angels managers
California Angels players
Caribbean Series managers
Chicago White Sox managers
Dallas Rangers players
Gold Glove Award winners
Los Angeles Angels players
Louisville Redbirds managers
Major League Baseball players with retired numbers
Major League Baseball shortstops
New York Mets players
Philadelphia Phillies managers
Pittsburgh Pirates players
Baseball players from San Francisco
Texas Rangers players
Toronto Blue Jays managers
Junípero Serra High School (San Mateo, California) alumni
Sportspeople of Italian descent